Dafdar or Davdar or Daftar or via Mandarin Chinese as Dabuda'er, is a township in the Taghdumbash Pamir located in Tashkurgan Tajik Autonomous County, Kashgar Prefecture, Xinjiang Uyghur Autonomous Region, China. The township is located on the China–Pakistan border. The southern part of the township is located in the Trans-Karakoram Tract claimed by India.

Name
'Dafdar' means 'door' or 'gateway' in the Sarikoli language (also known as 'Tajik', the language of Tajiks of Xinjiang).

History

The area has been used for grazing by various pastoral people in the region for centuries.

During the Qing dynasty, the Chinese claimed suzerainty over the area but permitted the Mir of Hunza to administer the region in return for a tribute. According to British colonial sources, this arrangement started during early Ayosh dynasty of Mir of Hunza, as the Mir conquered the Kirghiz nomads of Taghdumbash Pamir. The Mir erected a cairn in the village to evidence his control. The tribute system continued up until 1937.

In the 1875, British explorers recorded that Dafdar did not have a permanent settlement, but that it was used a caravan camp on the route between Tashkurgan and Hunza Valley. In the early 1900s, a group of Wakhi settled here with the consent of the Chinese authority.

In March 1950, Dafdar Township was established.

In 1959, Dafdar Township became a commune.

In 1966, Dafdar Commune was renamed Xianfeng Commune ('pioneer commune').

In 1975 in the closing days of the Cultural Revolution, the original name was restored.

In February 1985, Dafdar Commune was made a township.

Emerald deposit was discovered at Dafdar in 2003. These emeralds show similar chemical fingerprints to Afghan emeralds from Panjshir Valley.

Geography
K2, the second highest mountain on Earth, is located in the Trans-Karakoram Tract on the China-Pakistan border in Dafdar.

Dafdar village lies at an altitude of 3,400 m above sea level, just to the east of the Karakoram Highway.

Administrative divisions
, the township included five villages (Mandarin Chinese pinyin-derived names):
 Dafdar, Bayik (Atejiayili ), Raskam (Resikamu   / ), Bositeduokete, Khunjerab

Demographics

In 1997, 89.6% of the population of the township was Mountain Tajik (China) and 10.3% of the population was Kyrgyz.

It is inhabited by Wakhis.

As of the 2000s, there was one mosque in the township and twelve religious professionals.

Transportation
 China National Highway 314

See also
 Shaksgam River
 Chalachigu Valley
 Trans-Karakoram Tract
 Yinsugaiti Glacier
 Sarpo Laggo Glacier

References 

China–Pakistan border
Populated places in Xinjiang
Tashkurgan Tajik Autonomous County
Township-level divisions of Xinjiang